Forrestina Elizabeth Ross (23 June 1860 – 29 March 1936) was a notable New Zealand teacher, mountaineer, journalist and writer. She was born in Brixton, Surrey, England, in 1860. She was married to Malcolm Ross.

The Forrest Ross Glacier was named after her.

References

1860 births
1936 deaths
New Zealand mountain climbers
English emigrants to New Zealand
New Zealand schoolteachers
Female climbers
20th-century New Zealand writers
20th-century New Zealand women writers
19th-century New Zealand educators
20th-century New Zealand educators
19th-century New Zealand journalists
20th-century New Zealand journalists
19th-century women writers